Jürgen Oelke (born 25 November 1940) is a retired German rowing coxswain who had his best achievements in the coxed fours. In this event he won a world title in 1962, a European title in 1963 and a gold medal at the 1964 Summer Olympics.

References

External links
 

1940 births
Living people
Rowers from Berlin
Coxswains (rowing)
Olympic rowers of the United Team of Germany
Rowers at the 1964 Summer Olympics
Olympic gold medalists for the United Team of Germany
Olympic medalists in rowing
West German male rowers
World Rowing Championships medalists for West Germany
Medalists at the 1964 Summer Olympics
European Rowing Championships medalists